Berlin-Treptow-Köpenick is an electoral constituency (German: Wahlkreis) represented in the Bundestag. It elects one member via first-past-the-post voting. Under the current constituency numbering system, it is designated as constituency 84. It is located in southeastern Berlin, comprising the Treptow-Köpenick borough.

Berlin-Treptow-Köpenick was created for the 1994 federal election. Since 2005, it has been represented by Gregor Gysi of The Left.

Geography 
Berlin-Treptow-Köpenick is located in southeastern Berlin. As of the 2021 federal election, it is coterminous with the Treptow-Köpenick borough.

History 
Berlin-Treptow-Köpenick was created in 1994 and contained parts of the abolished constituencies of Berlin Friedrichshain – Treptow – Lichtenberg I and Berlin Köpenick – Lichtenberg II. Until 2002, it was named Berlin-Köpenick-Treptow. In the 1994 and 1998 elections, it was constituency 259 in the numbering system. In the 2002 through 2009 elections, it was number 85. Since the 2013 election, it has been number 84. Its borders have not changed since its creation.

Members 
The constituency was first represented by Siegfried Scheffler of the Social Democratic Party (SPD), who served from 1994 to 2005. In 2005, it was won by Gregor Gysi of The Left, then leader of his party's Bundestag group. He was re-elected in 2009, 2013, 2017 and 2021.

Election results

2021 election

2017 election

2013 election

2009 election

References 

Federal electoral districts in Berlin
Treptow-Köpenick
1994 establishments in Germany
Constituencies established in 1994